Photothermal effect is a phenomenon associated with electromagnetic radiation. It is produced by the photoexcitation of material, resulting in the production of thermal energy (heat).

It is sometimes used during treatment of blood vessel lesions, laser resurfacing, laser hair removal and laser surgery.

External links
Quantities, Terminology, and Symbols in Photothermal and Related Spectroscopies Research paper from IUPAC
Amazing Nano Materials: Photothermal and Photoacoustic Effects

Photochemistry